Pavel Viktorovich Makeyev (born July 20, 1966) is a Russian professional football coach currently managing FC Sportakademklub Moscow.

External links
 Career summary by KLISF

1966 births
Living people
Russian football managers